An Ottoman embassy to France occurred in 1534, with the objective to prepare and coordinate Franco-Ottoman offensives for the next year, 1535. The embassy closely followed a first Ottoman embassy to France in 1533, as well as the Conquest of Tunis by Hayreddin Barbarossa on 16 August 1534, which marked a strong reinforcement of Ottoman positions in the Western Mediterranean.

Arrival of the embassy
The Ottoman delegation arrived from Constantinople via Tunis at the French harbour of Marseille in October 1534. The delegation included two French ambassadors to the Porte who had accompanied them from Constantinople: Antonio Rincon and Cantelmo.

The contemporary French writer and eyewitness Valbelle would comment:

The delegation was not composed of pirates, but of janissaries, clad in uniforms with immaculate turbans. They travelled overland with Antonio Rincon, and reached Francis I at his court in Châtellerault.

At that time, Francis I was confronted with the Affair of the Placards, in which Protestants issued pamphlets criticizing the Mass in view of stopping efforts at a Catholic–Protestant rapprochement. Francis I was severely criticized for his tolerance towards Protestants, and had to pursue them. The Ottoman ambassadors accompanied Francis I to Paris, and attended the burning of those responsible for the Affair, on 21 January 1535 in front of the Cathedral of Notre-Dame de Paris.

Together a master plan was established for 1535, combining a revolt of pro-French factions in Italy; an Ottoman attack on Apulia and Calabria; an attack by Barbarossa from Tunis on Sicily, Naples and Tuscany; and attacks by England, Scotland and Denmark on the Low Countries, with the help of the German princes allied to France William of Fürstenberg and Christopher of Württemberg.

Departure and aftermath
The embassy departed Paris on 13 February 1535 with the new French ambassador to the Porte, Jean de la Forest, accompanied by Charles de Marillac and the scholar Guillaume de Postel. Jean de la Forest would successfully negotiate the Capitulations giving advantages and pre-eminence to France in relations with the Ottoman Empire. De la Forest also had secret instructions describing how he was to coordinate the military efforts between France and the Ottoman Empire:

The embassy arrived in Marseille on 3 April 1535 and departed on 11 April 1535 on the Ottoman galleys that had been waiting there. De la Forest departed together on a French galley, La Dauphine. They first stopped at Tunis, where Barbarossa armed a special galley to transport De la Forest to Constantinople.

Charles V managed to wreck the plans of Francis I by launching a major attack on the Ottomans with the Conquest of Tunis in June 1535, immediately after the departure of the embassy. Concomitantly, Pope Paul III issued an interdiction for Christians to fight between themselves during the time Charles V was fighting the Ottomans, effectively precluding Francis I from launching his offensive. At the same time, Suleiman himself was caught up in a bitter campaign of the Ottoman–Safavid War (1532–1555), which prevented him from participating to offensives in Europe during 1535.

See also
 Franco-Ottoman alliance
 Ottoman embassy to France (1533)

Notes

References
 Garnier, Edith, L'Alliance Impie Editions du Felin, 2008, Paris  Interview

France (1534)
Diplomatic missions in France
Ancien Régime
1534 in France
France–Ottoman Empire relations